The King Schoolhouse is a historic school building in the small town of King, Arkansas. Its main entry is centered on the southern facade, slightly recessed under an arch, with sidelight and transom windows. The Colonial Revival building was built in 1915, when King was a bustling lumber and railroad community, and served it as a school, church, and community center, and is the only known Colonial Revival school building in Sevier County. It continues to be used as a community center.

The building was listed on the National Register of Historic Places in 1996.

See also
National Register of Historic Places listings in Sevier County, Arkansas

References

School buildings on the National Register of Historic Places in Arkansas
Colonial Revival architecture in Arkansas
School buildings completed in 1915
Buildings and structures in Sevier County, Arkansas
National Register of Historic Places in Sevier County, Arkansas
1915 establishments in Arkansas